Fundamental physical constant may refer to:
 A dimensionless physical constant, one that is independent of the system of units used
 A physical constant that is a member of a set of universal constants containing the minimum number of such constants needed to define a physical theory